Primeval may refer to:
 Primeval forest, an area of forest that has attained great age
 Primeval number, a positive integer satisfying certain conditions
 Primeval history, name given by biblical scholars to the first eleven chapters of the Book of Genesis

Film and TV
Primeval (TV series), 2007 UK TV series
 Primeval: New World, a Canadian science fiction series, based on the British series Primeval
 Primeval (film), a 2007 American horror film
 Primeval (Doctor Who audio drama), a Big Finish audio play based on the BBC TV series Doctor Who
 "Primeval" (Buffy the Vampire Slayer), an episode of the TV series Buffy the Vampire Slayer

See also
 Primevil (disambiguation)
 Primitive (disambiguation) 
 Primordial (disambiguation)
 Prinivil, a hypertension drug